COPR or Copr may refer to:

 Copper Range Railroad, a former U.S. Class I railroad, by reporting mark
 Copr. (copyright), a legal right
 Copr, a build system for creating Fedora software packages
 Critique of Pure Reason, philosophical treatise written by Immanuel Kant

See also
 Copyright notice, formerly requiring "Copr."
 Copyright symbol, the symbol used in copyright notices (used instead of "Copr.")
 Copper (disambiguation)
 Copper, a metallic chemical element